Andres Unga (born 29 April 1966 in Viljandi) is an Estonian diplomat.

1996-2000, he was Ambassador of Estonia to Sweden.

In 2001, he was awarded with Order of the National Coat of Arms, V class.

References

1966 births
Living people
Estonian diplomats
Ambassadors of Estonia to Sweden
Recipients of the Order of the National Coat of Arms, 5th Class
Tallinn University of Technology alumni
People from Viljandi